Nigeria competed at the 1980 Summer Olympics in Moscow, USSR.
The nation returned to the Olympic Games after boycotting the 1976 Summer Olympics.

Results by event

Athletics
Men's 100 metres
Peter Okodogbe
 Heat — 10.39
 Quarterfinals — 10.34
 Semifinals — 10.51 (→ did not advance)

Samson Oyeledun
 Heat — 10.59
 Quarterfinals — 10.73 (→ did not advance)

Hammed Adio
 Heat — 10.58
 Quarterfinals — 10.67 (→ did not advance)

Men's 200 metres
 Hammed Adio
 Heat — 21.79 (→ did not advance)

Men's 4×400 metres Relay
 Sunday Uti, Hope Ezeigbo, Felix Imadiyi, and Dele Udo
 Heat — 3:14.1 (→ did not advance)

Men's Long Jump
 Kayode Elegbede
 Qualification — 7.82 m
 Final — 7.49 m (→ 11th place)

 Jubobosaye Kio
 Qualification — 7.77 m (→ did not advance)

 Yusuf Alli
 Qualification — 7.43 m (→ did not advance)

Women's 100 metres
 Oguzoeme Nsenu
 Heat — 11.72
 Quarterfinals — 11.55 (→ did not advance)

 Rufina Ubah
 Heat — 11.75
 Quarterfinals — 11.60 (→ did not advance)

Boxing
Men's Bantamweight (54 kg)
 Nureni Gbadamosi
 First Round — Bye
 Second Round — Lost to Michael Anthony (Guyana) on points (5-0)

Men's Featherweight (57 kg)
 William Azanor
 First Round — Bye
 Second Round — Lost to Tsacho Andreikovski (Bulgaria) after knock-out in first round

Men's Lightweight (60 kg)
 Christopher Ossai
 First Round — Lost to Richard Nowakowski (East Germany) on points (0-5)

Men's Light-Welterweight (63,5 kg)
 Peter Aydele
 First Round — Lost to Farouk Jawad (Iraq) on points (0-5)

Men's Heavyweight (+ 81 kg)
 Solomon Ataga
 First Round — Lost to Teófilo Stevenson (Cuba) after knock-out in first round

Football (soccer)

Men's team competition
 Preliminary Round (Group B)
 Lost to Kuwait (1-3)
 Drew with Czechoslovakia (1-1)
 Lost to Colombia (0-1)
 Quarter Finals
 Did not advance

Team Roster
 Best Ogedegbe
 Moses Effiong
 David Adiele
 Sylvanus Okpala
 Leotis Boateng
 John Orlando
 Tunde Bamidele
 Isima Okey
 Shefiu Mohamed
 Alloysius Atuegbu
 Henry Nwosu
 Felix Owolabi
 Mudashiru Lawal
 Adokie Amiesimaka
 Emmanuel Osigwe
 Kadiri Ikhana

References
Official Olympic Reports

Nations at the 1980 Summer Olympics
1980
1980 in Nigerian sport